The High Commission of Gabon in London is the diplomatic mission of Gabon in the United Kingdom.

From 1960 to 2022, it was called Embassy of Gabon. However, as Gabon joined the Commonwealth, despite Gabon had never been ruled by the United Kingdom throughout its history (it was ruled by France as part of the French Equatorial Africa colonial federation instead), in accordance with Commonwealth norms, the Gabonese mission gained the status of High Commission.

Gallery

References

External links
Official site

Gabon
Diplomatic missions of Gabon
Gabon–United Kingdom relations
Buildings and structures in the Royal Borough of Kensington and Chelsea
South Kensington